The El Paso Streetcar is a streetcar system in El Paso, Texas, that uses a fleet of restored PCC streetcars that had served the city's previous system until its closure in 1974. It opened for service on November 9, 2018. The system was constructed under the authority of the Camino Real Regional Mobility Authority, but when the major construction was completed, around spring 2018, it was transferred to Sun Metro, for operation and maintenance.

History 

Historically, the cities of El Paso and Ciudad Juárez relied on a unified streetcar system across the Rio Grande which initially consisted of horse and mule-drawn trolleys, which were replaced by the first electrified street cars in 1902. In 1913, the first urban streetcar lines appeared. Between 1920 and 1925, there were 52 miles (83 km) of trolley system, with 2.1 million passengers using the service in 1922. The increasing availability of the automobile led El Paso to abandon most of its streetcar infrastructure in the 1940s, with the exception of the international line, which was renewed with 20 PCC streetcars from San Diego in 1950.

On May 4, 1974, the last remaining cars in use made their final trips. They were taken to a desert area by the airport, where they eventually rusted and decayed.

Revival 

On June 5, 2012, the city council unveiled a new route, creating a narrow loop for the service; streetcars would travel north on Stanton Street, turn left at Glory Road/Baltimore, then south on Oregon Street. A downtown loop runs east on Franklin Avenue, south on Kansas Street, west on Father Rahm, and north on Santa Fe Street. The El Paso City Council approved going forward with the project in July 2014.

Construction began in late December 2015. , construction of the system was projected to cost $97 million. In November 2016, the city disclosed that construction funds had been extorted in a phishing scam perpetrated by an entity posing as a contractor – most of the funds had been recovered by the time it was publicly announced. By March 2018, construction was 95 percent complete. The first of the refurbished streetcars was received on March 19, 2018, and the first test trip on the line under power was made on April 3.

The system opened on Friday, November 9, 2018. On the three-day opening weekend, just six of the 27 stops were being served, from Santa Fe & 4th to Kansas & Mill, but all other stops were due to open on November 12, 2018. Fares are based on Sun Metro's fare structure, which means a $1.50 fare for riders not qualifying for any reduction; $1 for students and children; $0.30 for seniors. All rides were free on Fridays, Saturdays, and Sundays until January 5, 2019. 24-hour passes are $3.50; 7-day passes cost between $2.50 and $12.

Streetcar service was suspended on March 22, 2020, due to the COVID-19 pandemic, but resumed on Thursdays, Fridays, and Saturdays starting on July 29, 2021.

Rolling stock 
City officials expressed their desire to preserve the history of El Paso by refurbishing the old PCC streetcars that once made their way through Downtown from 1949 to 1974. The city had about eight streetcars, which were stored in a desert area at the El Paso International Airport. These cars were originally manufactured in 1937 for service in San Diego, California.

Work to restore six cars to operating condition began in 2015 and was carried out by Brookville Equipment Corporation. The cars are painted in color schemes used by the previous El Paso streetcar system from the 1950s until its closure in the 1970s, with three different versions – representing the 1950s, 1960s, and 1970s, – used on two cars each. Modifications to the cars included the installation of wheelchair lifts, to comply with the Americans with Disabilities Act, half-diamond pantographs in place of trolley poles, and the addition of air-conditioning. They have kept their original fleet numbers of 1504, 1506, 1511, 1512, 1514, and 1515.

The first of the restored streetcars, No. 1506, was received from Brookville on 19 March 2018. By mid-October, all but one of the six had been received.  The last of the six streetcars to complete its restoration, No. 1511, was received on December 19, 2018.

List of streetcar stops 
from Downtown El Paso to UTEP, then back to downtown
based on Figure 8 Loop order

 Downtown Loop
 Uptown Loop

See also 
List of Texas railroads
Streetcars in North America

References

External links 
 

Streetcars in Texas
Streetcar
Electric railways in Texas
Heritage railroads in Texas
Heritage streetcar systems
Railway lines opened in 2018
2018 establishments in Texas
650 V DC railway electrification
Town tramway systems by city